Ann Marie Horan, Irish actress on TG4 drama, Ros na Rún from 2007 to 2020.

Horan was born in Galway and raised in Eyre Square, the daughter of an actor who worked in An Taibhdhearc. She first acted on stage aged six. She studied French and Spanish at NUIG and became involved in DramSoc, the university's drama group. She graduated aged 19 and moved to Lille where she worked, and ran a small theatre, returning to Ireland a year later. She completed her master's degree, while on a part-time course at Dublin Theatre School. After work as a singer in County Clare she gained voice-work employment on RTÉ Radio.

She first appeared on Ros na Rún on its pilot, broadcast in 1992. Her character was written out but she returned in 1995 to play Frances, whom she plays up to the present.

In a recent interview, she listed her favourite and worst things about Galway as "The Atlantic" and  "The drizzly rain".

References

External links
 Ros na Rún

Alumni of the University of Galway
Irish stage actresses
Irish television actresses
Actresses from County Galway
Living people
Year of birth missing (living people)